The 2015–16 Loyola Ramblers women's basketball team represents Loyola University Chicago during the 2015–16 NCAA Division I women's basketball season. The Ramblers, led by third year head coach Sheryl Swoopes, play their home games at the Joseph J. Gentile Arena and were members of the Missouri Valley Conference. They finished the season 14–16, 10–8 in MVC play to finish in fifth place. They lost in the quarterfinals of the Missouri Valley women's tournament to Southern Illinois.

Roster

Schedule

|-
!colspan=9 style="background:#800000; color:#D4AF37;"| Exhibition

|-
!colspan=9 style="background:#800000; color:#D4AF37;"| Non-conference regular season

|-
!colspan=9 style="background:#800000; color:#D4AF37;"| Missouri Valley regular season

|-
!colspan=9 style="background:#800000; color:#D4AF37;"| Missouri Valley Women's Tournament

See also
2015–16 Loyola Ramblers men's basketball team

References

Loyola Ramblers women's basketball seasons
Loyola
Loyola Ramblers
Loyola Ramblers